Francis Faure was a French bicycle racer who captured the world hour record in July 1933 on a Vélocar. This prompted the Union Cycliste Internationale (UCI) to restrict bicycle designs for all future competitions.

Early life
Francis was brother of Benoît Faure and Eugène Faure.

1933
On July 7, 1933, Faure rode a Vélocar developed by Charles Mochet in the Vélodrome d'Hiver in Paris, and he beat the hour record of 44.247 km set by Oscar Egg on August 18, 1914, by 0.808 km. At the time, Faure was considered a "second-rate" cyclist and was not Mochet's first choice. The unfaired, or "stock" recumbent record stood until it was broken in 2007 by an "unclassified" racer Sean Costin, who covered 48.80 km (28.46 mi) on the 382m outdoor concrete velodrome in Northbrook, Illinois. He rode a recumbent made by the Polish manufacturer Velokraft (model name NoCom), which he converted to a fixed-gear for the indoor event.

1938

In 1938, Faure rode an updated, streamlined Vélocar to become the first cyclists to exceed 50 km in one hour, but this record is unofficial because of the UCI ban on non-traditional designs. This record was not broken on a conventional bicycle until Francesco Moser rode one for 51.151 km in 1984.

Postscript
Faure moved to Australia when WWII started, and died there in 1948.

References

French male cyclists
Cyclists from Auvergne-Rhône-Alpes
1910 births
1953 deaths
Sportspeople from Puy-de-Dôme